Anna of Brooklyn is a 1958 French-Italian comedy film directed by Vittorio De Sica and  and starring Gina Lollobrigida, De Sica and Amedeo Nazzari.

It was shot at the Cinecittà Studios in Rome. The film's sets were designed by the art director Gastone Medin. It was distributed by Columbia Pictures in Britain and the United States and by Gloria Film in West Germany.

Plot
A rich young widowed Gina Lollobrigida as Anna, leaves New York and searches for a husband in the village in Italy she was born in.

Cast
 Gina Lollobrigida as Anna
 Vittorio De Sica as Don Luigi
 Dale Robertson as Raffaele
 Amedeo Nazzari as Ciccone
 Peppino De Filippo as Peppino
 Carla Macelloni as Rosina
 Gabriella Pallotta as Mariuccia
 Luigi De Filippo as Zitto-Zitto
 Clelia Matania as Camillina
 Renzo Cesana as Baron Trevassi
 Terence Hill as Chicco - Don Luigi's nephew 
 Augusta Ciolli as Aunt Carmela
 Gigi Reder as Berardo
 Fausto Guerzoni Gentleman who buys the medicine
 Emma Baron
 
 
 Carlo Rizzo
 Molly Robinson
 Attilio Torelli
 Marco Tulli
 Ruth Volner
 Pasquale Misiano
 Alfredo Ricalzone
 Dori Romano

Awards
Won
 1958 David di Donatello Awards: David for Best Producer - 

Nominated
 8th Berlin International Film Festival: Golden Bear

References

Bibliography
 Chiti, Roberto & Poppi, Roberto. Dizionario del cinema italiano: Dal 1945 al 1959. Gremese Editore, 1991.

External links

1958 films
1958 comedy films
Films directed by Vittorio De Sica
1950s Italian-language films
French comedy films
Commedia all'italiana
Columbia Pictures films
Films with screenplays by Joseph Stefano
Films scored by Alessandro Cicognini
Films shot at Cinecittà Studios
Titanus films
1950s Italian films
1950s French films